Iwaruna robineaui is a moth of the family Gelechiidae. It was described by Jacques Nel in 2008. It is found in France, where it has been recorded from the eastern Pyrenees.

The wingspan is 12 mm for males and 9.5 mm for females.

References

Moths described in 2008
Iwaruna